Hip Chick Farms is a poultry farm in Sonoma County, California. Run by Jen Johnson, the farm produces products made from ethically-raised chickens raised on a nearby Sonoma County, California farm. The co-owners and married couple, focus on making frozen chicken dinners with items such as spicy wings, chicken meatballs and nuggets.

Founded in 2011, Hip Chick Farms received some help from the Sonoma County Loan Fund to kick start the company, and again in 2014 to print new packaging with an additional loan from Whole foods for the rebranding. The revamp of the packaging from plastic tubs to boxes led to a 500% increase in sales. The duo also started a KickStarter campaign which raised them $25,308 from 114 different donors.

Hip Chick Farms was in 300 stores in 2015 and will be in 1500 stores by the end of 2016, including national chains such as Sprouts, Target and Whole Foods and local stores such as Northern California Safeways.

There is a large market for organic, healthy frozen dinners. The sale of frozen food is expected to be up a billion dollars by 2018 over its $22 billion in sales in 2013 after years of stagnation. This is in part due to the new healthier options being introduced by frozen food companies. Since Hip Chick Farms chicken is low sodium, antibiotic free, gluten free, hormone free organic, with no fillers or additives, and from ethically raised chickens from locally sourced farms, they fit in this specialized food niche.

References 

Sonoma County, California
Farms in California
American companies established in 2011
2011 establishments in California
Women in agriculture